Fatick is a town in Senegal, located between M'bour and Kaolack and inhabited by the Serer people. Its 2005 population was estimated at 24,243. It is the capital of the Fatick Region and the Fatick Department.

Toponymy

Its name (Fatick), including its region and department take their names from one of the Serer maternal clans (Fatik)—which derives from the Serer term Fati Ubadik ("we have more to go"). The name is also spelled Patik following its pronunciation which is the same as the Fatik matriclan. The 15th century King of Sine Wasilla Faye named it after his father's matriclan. His father was a member of the Patik matriclan.

History

The city has several ancient sites classified as historical monuments and added to the World heritage list. There is also the site of Mind Ngo Mindiss, located in the Sine River, where libations and offerings are made, the site of Ndiobaye, where traditional ceremonies takes place, and Ndeb Jab, which houses a sacred tree at Ndiaye-Ndiaye. These sites are sacred places in Serer religion. The Xooy ceremony (or Khoy), performed by the Serer high priests and priestesses (the Saltigues), takes place at Fatick once a year.

Geography
Fatick is located "in the savanna belt of the West African Sahel, a sandy arid region south of the Sahara desert." The nearest towns are Nerane, Pourham, Mbirk Pourham and Tok. Dakar, the capital of Senegal, is located 155 km away.

Climate
Under Köppen-Geiger climate classification system, it has a hot semi-arid climate (BSh).

Population
In the censuses of 1988 and 2002, the estimate population figures were 18,416 and 23,149 respectively. In 2007, according to official estimates, the population was 24,855.

Economy
Since the peanut trade is losing momentum, salt marshes are the main local resource.

Notable people from Fatick
Macky Sall, former Prime Minister and current President of Senegal
Chérif Ousmane Sarr, footballer
Alioune Badara M'Bengue, politician

Fatick in popular culture
Carolee Buck, who with her husband Art worked in Fatick as a Peace Corps volunteer, published Peace Corps Senegal, 1968-1970 in 2020.

References

Communes of Senegal
Fatick Region
Regional capitals in Senegal
Populated places in Fatick Region
Serer holy places
Holy cities